Navy Wife may refer to:
 Navy Wife (1956 film), a comedy film
 Navy Wife (1935 film), an American drama film